North West Frontier (USA: Flame Over India; Australia: Empress of India) is a 1959 British Eastmancolor adventure film starring Kenneth More, Lauren Bacall, Herbert Lom, Wilfrid Hyde-White and I. S. Johar. The CinemaScope film was produced by Marcel Hellman and directed by J. Lee Thompson. It was a commercial success at the British box-office in 1959. The film's success led to J. Lee Thompson beginning his American career as a director.

The film is set in the North West Frontier Province of British India (now within modern Pakistan). It explores the ethnic tensions within British India after Muslim rebels attack a fortress and kill a Hindu maharajah.

Plot
In 1905 on the North West Frontier of British India, a maharajah asks British Army Captain Scott to take his young son, Prince Kishan, to Haserabad and then send him to Delhi to protect him from an uprising. Accompanying them is the prince's governess, an American widow named Mrs. Wyatt. They leave as the rebels storm the palace and kill the prince's father. This makes his five-year-old son the leader of the Hindu population in the region.

On arrival at Haserabad, Captain Scott sees that many local Hindus and Europeans are leaving on the last train to Kalapur. The Muslim rebels soon close in and take control of the outer wall and gate beside the railway yard. The British governor tells Scott that he must take the young prince to Kalapur for his safety. In the railyard, the British captain discovers the "Empress of India", an old railway engine cared for by its driver Gupta, affectionately known as Victoria. They calculate that it will manage the journey if limited to pulling a single carriage.

Early the next morning, Captain Scott quietly loads the passengers onto the old train. They include Mrs. Wyatt, Prince Kishan, arms dealer Mr. Peters, British expatriate Mr. Bridie, Lady Windham (the governor's wife), two British Indian Army NCOs, and Dutch journalist Mr. Peter van Leyden (Herbert Lom). Victoria quietly freewheels down a gradient and out of the yard, but when her whistle is accidentally sounded, Gupta fires the engine and crashes her through the outer gate. The enemy fire on them and chase them but cannot keep up with the train.

Later that morning, the train encounters an abandoned train at a remote station. This is the refugee train which preceded them out of Haserabad. Everyone on board has been massacred (presumably by the rebels). Despite being told not to by Captain Scott, Mrs. Wyatt leaves the carriage and finds one survivor, a baby concealed by his mother's body.

The next morning, the train must stop because a portion of the track has been blown up. Mrs. Wyatt spots the signaling flashes of a heliograph atop a mountain summit, and everyone quickly realises that the Muslim rebels are sitting in ambush in the surrounding hills. With track repairs barely finished by Captain Scott, the train gets away under a hail of gunfire. Gupta is wounded but survives.

Later that day, while stopping to refill the engine's water tank, Scott walks into the pump house to find Van Leyden allowing Prince Kishan to stand dangerously close to the pump's rapidly spinning flywheel. In the evening Van Leyden refuses alcohol and the group correctly deduce he is Muslim. He explains this by saying he is half Indian. During the night, Mr. Van Leyden again approaches the prince, only to notice Lady Windham watching him.

The train reaches a bomb-damaged bridge. There is nothing under one section of rail except the ground far below. Scott has the others carefully cross that section one by one to lighten the train that will follow them. Finally, only Van Leyden and the prince remain behind. Van Leyden seems to deliberately hold the boy back and endanger his life. He falls and Scott grabs his hand, pulling him back to safety. Afterward, Scott accuses Van Leyden of trying to kill the prince, and he places the reporter under arrest. After that, Captain Scott, under Gupta's guidance, carefully maneuvers the train across.

Later, while going through a tunnel, Van Leyden uses the opportunity to overpower his guard. He uses a Maxim machine gun to threaten the passengers and now declares his loyalty to the Muslim cause. He is unable to kill Prince Kishnan because the boy is with Captain Scott in the locomotive's cab. Scott returns to the carriage with the young prince after spotting more rebel heliograph signals, but they are saved when the machine gun is knocked off balance by a kick from Mr. Bridie. Scott crawls up the carriage and starts to fight him. The two men end on the roof. At the climax of the fight a shot rings out: Mrs. Wyatt has shot Van Leyden with one of the rifles. He falls off and dies as the Muslim rebels ride up on horses.

The Muslim rebels chase the train on horseback but are thwarted when  Victoria enters a two-mile-long hillside tunnel. On the other side, the train reaches the safety of Kalapur to strains of The Eton Boating Song. At the station, young Prince Kishan is met by his Hindu entourage, while Gupta is taken to hospital, and Lady Windham is informed that her husband, the governor, is safe. On learning Prince Kishan may yet fight the British, as his father instructed him, Scott quotes Kipling ("Be thankful you're livin', and trust to your luck, And march to your front like a soldier") before he and Mrs. Wyatt leave together carrying the infant she had saved earlier.

Cast

 Kenneth More as Capt. William Charles Willoughby Scott
 Lauren Bacall as Catherine Wyatt
 Herbert Lom as Peter van Leyden
 Wilfrid Hyde-White as Mr. Bridie
 I. S. Johar as Gupta, the driver
 Ursula Jeans as Lady Windham
 Eugene Deckers as Peters
 Ian Hunter as Sir John Windham
 Jack Gwillim as Brigadier Ames
 Govind Raja Ross as Prince Kishan
 Basil Hoskins as A.D.C.
 S. M. Asgaralli as Havildar (1st Indian Soldier)
 S. S. Chowdhary as 2nd Indian Soldier
 Moultrie Kelsall as British Correspondent
 Lionel Murton as American Correspondent
 Jaron Yalton as Indian Correspondent
 Homi Bode as Indian Correspondent
 Frank Olegario as Rajah
 Ronald Cardew as Staff Colonel at Kalapur Station

Production

Casting
In 1957, More announced he would play "a romantic adventure" part set during the Indian Mutiny, Nightrunners of Bengal. That film was never made and it is likely that More was transferred instead to North West Frontier, a similar project. Olivia de Havilland was originally announced as the female lead. Lauren Bacall's casting was announced in January 1959. She sold her Hollywood house and put her children in school in London for the duration of the shoot.

Filming
The production started in Rajasthan, India in April 1959. More recalled in his memoirs that it was a physically difficult shoot with many of the cast and crew falling ill with dysentery and other illnesses. The unit stayed at a former Maharajah's palace which had been turned into a hotel. Several Rajasthan landmarks were used as filming locations. Jal Mahal (meaning "Water Palace") in Jaipur city, the capital of the state of Rajasthan, represented the Maharaja's palace at the start of the film. Although it now stands within Man Sagar Lake, the water levels in the 1950s were so low, horseriders could be filmed riding up to its entrance. In Amber the Amber Fort was used as the British governor's residence; other scenes prominently feature the Jagat Shiromani Temple complex. Hundreds of extras were employed for the shots filmed in India. The metre-gauge railway running through Jaipur was used for the scenes where More escapes by train and later discovers the massacre of the refugee train.

Filming of the rail sequences started in the province of Granada, Spain on 10 May 1959 and took five weeks to complete. The area's dry arid steppe was used to portray British India. Parts of the railway, which is now abandoned, traversed the northern part of the Sierra Nevada between Guadix and Baza. The bomb-damaged rail bridge that the train must cross is the Anchurón bridge over the Solanas de la Carreta near the hamlet of Belerda in Granada (at ). The ending used Iznalloz railway station near Barrio Primero De Mayo (at ).

Reception
The film was a major hit in the UK, being among the six most popular films in Great Britain for the year ended 31 October 1959. Kenneth More wrote in his memoirs that it "was a great success". According to Kinematograph Weekly the film performed "better than average" at the British box office in 1959.

The film was one of seven made by Rank which were bought for distribution in the US by 20th Century Fox.  Lauren Bacall called it a "good little movie ... with a stupid title" (referring to the US title, Flame Over India).

The Guardian called it "a big British western."

George MacDonald Fraser praised the performance of I.S. Johar:
It was a true rendering of a type imitated successfully by Peter Sellers and others, the quaintly-spoken ‘Oh-jollee-good-Sahib’ funny Indian — a genuine character familiar to everyone who knows the subcontinent. One critic took violent exception to Johar’s performance: it was a disgraceful caricature, and Johar should be ashamed of himself. I’d like to believe the critic thought that was true, but I doubt it. I suspect the critic knew Johar’s portrayal was absolutely faithful, but preferred to pretend it wasn’t because the critic found it embarrassing, and didn’t like to think that Indians ever really behaved like that — or if they did, it shouldn’t be shown on screen. In other words, damn the truth if it doesn’t fit with what one would like to believe is true — an attitude which, honesty aside, seems to me offensively patronising.
Fraser admired the film and More's performance saying "he had a cheery truculence that was much closer to the real Imperial type than the conventional stiff upper lip." He added "The one flaw [of the film] was the title; I remarked to the technical adviser, a senior ex-Indian Army officer, that it seemed odd, having a Hindu prince up yonder, and he replied that he had no idea where the film was meant to be taking place, but wherever it was, it was not the Frontier."

The film led to J. Lee Thompson being hired to direct Guns of Navarone. After original director Alexander Mackendrick was fired, star Gregory Peck saw Northwest Frontier and agreed for Thompson to take over.

Nominations

References

 Bibliography
 Chibnall, Steve, J. Lee Thompson Manchester University Press, 2000

External links

 
 
 North West Frontier at Rotten Tomatoes
 North West Frontier at BFI Screenonline
 North West Frontier at British Film Institute (archived)

1959 films
1950s British films
1950s English-language films
1950s historical adventure films
British Empire war films
British historical adventure films
CinemaScope films
Films directed by J. Lee Thompson
Films set in 1905
Films set in the British Raj
Films set in Khyber Pakhtunkhwa
Films set on trains
Films shot in India
Films shot at Pinewood Studios
Films shot in Spain
Province of Granada
Rail transport films